The Christian Doctrine Fathers officially named Congregation of Christian Doctrine, abbreviated D.C. and also commonly called the Doctrinaries, is a Catholic clerical religious congregation of Pontifical Right for men. 

As of 31 December 2020, the congregation consisted of 20 communities with 85 religious, 54 of them priests. Dottrinari priests are devoted mainly to parish ministry, teaching and publishing—especially catechetical texts.

History 
The Congregation was founded on September 29, 1592 in L'Isle-sur-la-Sorgue, France by French priest César de Bus (1544–1607) as a community of priests devoted to the secular education of children. It was approved by the Holy See on 23 December 1597.

The congregation was reorganized by Pope Benedict XIII and Pope Benedict XIV, who in 1747 joined the brotherhood founded in Rome in 1560 by Marco de Sadis Cusani.

Notable members
 
 
 
 
 ; Entered the order in 1648 and left it in 1659.

Notes

External links 

 

Catholic orders and societies